Ganesha I Love You is a 1997 Kannada film directed by Phani Ramachandra where he uses his favorite screen-title Ganesha. Ananth Nag reprised the titular character. The movie was based on a story by actor Vishnuvardhan with core plot elements adapted from the novel Rendu Rella Aaru by Malladi Venkata Krishna Murthy.

Cast
 Ananth Nag as Ganesha
 Sithaara
 Ravinder Mann
 Sunad Raj

References

1997 films
1990s Kannada-language films
Indian comedy films
Films scored by Rajan–Nagendra
Films directed by Phani Ramachandra
1997 comedy films